Let's Polka is a collection of Neal Morse, Shmenge Morse, and Richard Morse doing polka along with some Christmas music and Sola Scriptura demos. This is the tenth release in the Neal Morse Inner Circle series.

Personnel

Band
 Neal Morse - Vocals, guitar, keyboards, piano, bass
 Shmenge Morse
 Richard Morse

Track listing
Polka
 "Polka with the Morse Brothers!" (featuring Shmenge and Richard Morse)
Neal's original Christmas Choral Music:
<LI> "Our Savior Has Come"
<LI> "Children of the Light"
<LI> "Peaceful in the Night"
<LI> "He Was Born To Be A King"
<LI> "Can You Hear The Bells?"
<LI> "Song of the Messiah"
<LI> "In Him"
Christmas Brass Band Recordings:
<LI> "Preamble"
<LI> "Lord of the Kings"
<LI> "Jingle Bells"
<LI> "Christmas Time Is Here"
<LI> "Big Bad Drummer Boy"
Neal's Demos:
<LI> "Excerpts from the “Sola Scriptura” Demos"

Neal Morse albums
2006 albums